Goree is a 2019 Sri Lankan Sinhala action-thriller film directed by Harsha Udakanda and produced by Nishantha Jayawardena for Hiruna Films. It stars Aryan Kularatne in debut acting with Sriyantha Mendis in lead roles along with Roshan Ranawana and Rajitha Hiran. Music composed by Niroshan Dreams. It is the 1333rd Sri Lankan film in the Sinhala cinema. The film is influenced by Kollywood films Theri and Vedalam.

The film marks as the first film production by MPI theaters.

Plot

Cast
 Kelum Aryan Kularathne as Inspector Adeesha	Ranasinghe
 Pahandi Nethara as Shanaya Baby
 Rajitha Hiran as Inspector Silva	
 Roshan Ranawana	as Christho	
 Sriyantha Mendis	as Minister	
 Teena Shanell Fernando as Hiruni		
 Vinu Udani Siriwardhana as Indu, Shenaya's mother	
 Anuj Ranasinghe as Desmond	
 Kumara Ranepura as Main Thug	
 D.B. Gangodathenna		
 Pubudu Chathuranga as Disabled Ex-cop	
 Chathura Perera as School principal	
 Jayarathna Galagedara		
 Mahesh Randeniya		
 Harindu Waruna
 Sanet Dikkumbura
Amila Karunanayake

References

External links
 
 Official facebook page

2019 films
2010s Sinhala-language films
Remakes of Sri Lankan films